Uranium ditelluride, (UTe2), an unconventional superconductor, discovered to be a superconductor in 2018.

Superconductivity in UTe2 appears to be a consequence of triplet electrons spin-pairing.  The material acts as a topological superconductor, stably conducting electricity without resistance even in high magnetic fields.

References 

Superconductors